Lime Creek is a  tributary of the Winnebago River in Minnesota and Iowa. Via the Winnebago, Shell Rock, Cedar, and Iowa rivers, it is part of the Mississippi River watershed.

See also
List of rivers of Iowa
List of rivers of Minnesota

References

Rivers of Minnesota
Rivers of Iowa
Tributaries of the Mississippi River